Forbestra is a genus of clearwing (ithomiine) butterflies, named by Fox in 1967. They are in the brush-footed butterfly family, Nymphalidae.

Species
Arranged alphabetically.
Forbestra equicola (Cramer, [1780])
Forbestra olivencia (Bates, 1862)
Forbestra proceris (Weymer, 1883)

References

Ithomiini
Nymphalidae of South America
Nymphalidae genera